"Hot Hot Hot" is a song written and first recorded by Montserratian musician Arrow, featured on his 1982 studio album, Hot Hot Hot. The song was a commercially successful dance floor single, with cover versions subsequently released by artists in several countries, including in 1987 by American singer Buster Poindexter. 
The song was Arrow's first chart hit, peaking at No. 59 on the UK Singles Chart. A remix of the song, dubbed as the "World Carnival Mix '94" was later released in 1994 and peaked higher than the original, at number 38 on the UK Singles Chart.

Buster Poindexter version
The song was later covered in 1987 by American singer David Johansen, as his lounge singer persona Buster Poindexter, and released as the first single from his album Buster Poindexter. It garnered extensive airplay through radio, MTV, and other television appearances. The music video is unique in the fact that it crosses the two identities: despite being in the Buster Poindexter persona, the video begins with Johansen briefly mentioning his role as the frontman for the 1970s proto-punk band the New York Dolls, showing the band's vinyl and tossing them aside while talking about the "really outrageous clothes" he wore and how he came to be interested in a "refined and dignified kind of a situation", which leads into the song.

In an interview on National Public Radio, Johansen called the tune "the bane of my existence," owing to its pervasive popularity as a karaoke and wedding song.

Don Omar version
In 2013, reggaeton artist Don Omar released a cover titled "Feeling Hot" for his upcoming live album Hecho en Puerto Rico. His version peaked at No. 22 on the Billboard Hot Latin Songs chart in the United States.  Omar's cover led to Arrow posthumously winning the ASCAP Latin Award on the Urban category.

Charts

Arrow version

Notes:
 1 - Denotes chart position of 1994 "World Carnival Mix '94" version.

Certifications

Buster Poindexter version

References

Funk, Ray (1998).  Kaiso No 15 - December 26, 1998

Soca songs
1983 singles
1986 FIFA World Cup
1987 singles
2013 singles
Don Omar songs
Vengaboys songs
1982 songs
Chrysalis Records singles
RCA Records singles
FIFA World Cup songs